Surasak Thong-aon is a Thai footballer who plays as a  goalkeeper.

References

External links

Living people
1994 births
Surasak Thong-aon
Surasak Thong-aon
Surasak Thong-aon
Surasak Thong-aon
Association football goalkeepers
Surasak Thong-aon